August Strindberg (1849–1912), was a Swedish dramatist and painter.

Strindberg may also refer to:

People
 Nils Strindberg (1872–1897), Swedish photographer
 Friedrich Strindberg (1897–1978), Swedish writer, son of Frida Uhl and Frank Wedekind, adopted by August
 Anita Strindberg (born 1937), Swedish actor
 Henrik Strindberg (born 1954), Swedish composer

Other
 Strindberg Museum, Stockholm, Sweden
 Strindberg (crater), an impact basin in the Shakespeare quadrangle of Mercury